Benyamin Sueb (5 March 19395 September 1995) was an Indonesian comedian, actor and singer. He released 46 studio albums and starred in more than 50 films. He received two Citra Awards for Intan Berduri in 1973 and Si Doel Anak Modern in 1975.

Early life
Benyamin was born in Kemayoran, Batavia, on 5 March 1939. His parents were Suaeb and Aisyah. His father's real name was Sukirman, but changed to Suaeb since he lived in Batavia. At the age of two, Benyamin's father died. Later on, he was permitted to be a street performer. In 1946, he studied at Bendungan Jago Elementary School. When he was in the fifth or sixth grade, he moved to Santo Yusuf Elementary School in Bandung. After graduating, he continued his studies at Taman Madya Cikini Junior High School, and then Taman Siswa Senior High School in Kemayoran. He later studied at the Jakarta Academy of Banking for one year, but did not finish. He originally wanted to become a pilot, but his mother forbade him; he eventually found work as bread seller, then as a bus conductor.

Career

Music
In the 1950s, Benyamin joined the Melody Boys, who played calypso music, rhumba, cha-cha, jazz, blues, rock n roll and some keroncong. The band performed some famous songs including "When I Fall in Love", "Blue Moon" and "Unchained Melody". They also performed their own songs, like "Kisah Cinta" ("Love Story"), "Panon Hideung" ("Black Eye") and "Si Neneng". He also played jazz with Jack Lemmers and Bill Saragih. In 1963, the Melody Boys changed their name to Melodi Ria. In the late 1960s, several songs that were composed by him were sung by Bing Slamet, including "Nonton Bioskop" ("Watching a Movie at the Theatre"), "Hujan Gerimis" ("Drizzle"), "Endeng-Endengan" and "Ada-Ada Saja" ("It is What it is"). From the late 1960s until the early 1970s, he was influenced by John Mayall & The Bluesbreakers' blues and James Brown's soul. In 1977, Benyamin wrote "Pungli", a critical song to government.

In 1992, he formed a new group named Al-Haj. The band released the album Biang Kerok. In "Ampunan" ("Forgiveness"), he sang seriously. However, in "I'm a Teacher" and "Kisah Kucing Tua" ("Story of an Old Cat") he sang humorously. Style-wise, "Dingin-Dingin Dimandiin" ("Cold when Bathed") is rock. "Ampunan" influenced by Genesis' Watcher of the Skies. The album was also influenced by The Beatles' "Lady Madonna".

Benyamin used music as a medium of reflection and contemplation, to critique the current socio-political situation. His music is a portrait of the marginal. Many of his used the theme of the "tukang" (meaning handyman in Indonesian), such as "Tukang Solder", "Tukang Becak", and "Tukang Kredit". His musical style was various. He used some blues, soul, and funk musics in his works. Other genres he used in his songs were rock and dangdut.

Film

In 1970, Benyamin made his debut in Banteng Betawi. In 1972, he starred in his eighth film as Jamal, the main character in Intan Berduri. He was paired with Rima Melati. In 1973, he collaborated with Bing Slamet on Ambisi (Ambition) and Bing Slamet Setan Djalanan (Bing Slamet the Street Demon). He also collaborated with Sjumandjaja on Si Doel Anak Betawi. After starring in Si Doel Anak Betawi, he appeared in the sequel, Si Doel Anak Modern in 1975.

As a producer, he formed the movie company Jiung Film, which created Musuh Bebuyutan (Arch-Nemesis; 1974), Benyamin Koboi Ngungsi (Benjamin the Refugee Cowboy; 1975) and Hippies Lokal (Local Hippies; 1976). He also starred in eleven films which featured his name in the title, including Benyamin Biang Kerok (1972), Benyamin Brengsek (Benyamin the Asshole; 1973) and Benyamin Jatuh Cinta (Benyamin Falls in Love; 1976).

In the 1980s, after releasing Betty Bencong Slebor (Betty, the Frightful Transvestite), he decided to stop producing his own films and closed his movie company due to his revenues being less than production costs.

He played in more than 53 films, as the main character or a supporting character.

Death

He died of a heart attack on 5 September 1995 after playing soccer.

Personal life
In 1959, Benyamin married Noni. He proposed to her, but was rejected by her stepfather. After that, he proposed to Noni's biological father and was accepted. One year later, Beib, his first son was born. He divorced Noni on 7 July 1979 and reconciled in the same year.

Awards
In 1973, Benyamin received a Citra Award for Intan Berduri. In 1975, he won another for Si Doel Anak Modern. In 1995, he received a special award from the committee of Festival Sinetron Indonesia for his contribution to the development of Indonesian soap operas.

Benyamin was celebrated in a Google Doodle on 22 September 2020, on the occasion of the commemoration of a park with his name in East Jakarta.

Awards and nominations

Discography

 Kancil Kesasar/Kue Onde (A Mousedeer Who Got Lost / Onde Cake; Mesra Records)
 Si Jampang (Melodi Record)
 Oom Senang (Happy Uncle; Mesra Record)
 Brang Breng Brong (Diamond Record)
 Jangkrik Genggong (Barking Cricket; Mutiara Record)
 Apollo (Indah Records)
 Tukang Tuak (Tuak Salesman; Undah Records)
 Nonton Pecoen (Watching Dragon Boats Race; Remaco)
 Keluarga Gila (Crazy Family; Remaco)
 Tukang Sado (Caravan Man; Remaco)
 Tukang Becak (Pedicab Driver; Remaco)
 Terus Turun (Keep Going Down; Remaco)
 Steambath (Remaco)
 Dul-Dul Tjak (Mutiara Records)
 Patjaran (Dating; Indah Records)
 Ngupi (Remaco)
 Nyari Kutu (Looking for Mites; Indah Records)
 Tukang Loak (Seller of Second-hand goods; Indah Records)
 Ngibing (J&B)
 Maredel (Remaco)
 Mak Minta Makan Mak (Mom, Food Please Mom; Remaco)
 Anak Sekarang (Modern Children; Remaco)
 Blues Kejepit Pintu (Blues Caught in the Door; Remaco)
 Bul Bul Efendi (Irama Tara)
 Kicir-Kicir (Windmills; Remaco)
 Asal Nguap (Yawning Indiscriminately; Indah Records)
 Makan (Eat; Remaco)
 Main Congklak (Playing with Stilts; Irama Tara)
 Ketemu Bayi Tabung (Meeting a Test Tube Baby; Irama Tara)
 Soraya (Fila Records)
 Telepon Cinta (Love's Call; Insan Record/RCA)
 Martabak (Insan Record)
 Ngibing Betawi (Varia Nada Utama)
 Cintaku Berat di Ongkos (My Love is Heavy on the Cost; Virgo Ramayana Records)
 Assoy (Attractive; Ben's Records)
 Duit (Money; Mutiara Records)
 Bayi Tabung (Test Tube Baby; Insan Records)
 Mat Codet (Irama Asia)
 Tua-Tua Komersiel (Old but Commercial; Gesit Records)
 Saya Bilang (I Say; Abadi Records)
 Telepon Umum (Public Telephone; Purnama Records)
 Belajar Membaca (Learning to Read; Irama Asia)
 Nostalgila (Crazy Nostalgia; Asia Records)
 Sang Kodok (The Frog; BBB)
 Biang Kerok featuring Al-Haj (Provocateur; Virgo Ramayana/Ben's Records)
 Panglima Badul

Endorsements
 Mitsubishi Colt T120SS (1991)
 King Kong (1994)
 Neo Rheumacyl (1995)

References

General sources 
 
 
 
 
 

1939 births
1995 deaths
Betawi people
Indonesian male comedians
Indonesian comedians
Indonesian male film actors
20th-century Indonesian male singers
Indonesian Muslims
Indonesian male television actors
People from Jakarta
20th-century Indonesian male actors
Muslim male comedians
20th-century comedians

Cause of Death
Heart attack after playing football